Biraj Mohan Das Gupta or Dasgupta (c. 1889 – 1945) was a Bengali parasitologist, known for his discovery, with Robert Knowles, of the Plasmodium species now known as Plasmodium knowlesi.

Biography
After qualifying as a physician, Das Gupta was appointed in 1921 to a position as a researcher and assistant surgeon at the Calcutta School of Tropical Medicine.

At the Calcutta School of Tropical Medicine, in 1931 H. G. M. Campbell detected the Plasmodium species now known as P. knowlesi in a macaque imported from Singapore. Campbell showed his discovery to his supervisor Lionel Everard Napier, who injected the strain into three monkeys, one of which developed symptoms of malaria. Aware of the Protozoological Department's search for a monkey malaria strain, Napier and Campbell gave the infected monkey to Das Gupta, working under Knowles. Das Gupta maintained the Plasmodium species by serial passage in monkeys until Knowles returned from leave. In 1932, Knowles and Das Gupta published their description of the Plasmodiium species and their account of how it could be transmitted from monkey to human by blood passage to three human volunteers. The Plasmodium species was not given a name by Knowles and Das Gupta but was named Plasmodium knowlesi by Sinton and Mulligan in 1932.

Das Gupta was the director of the Calcutta School of Tropical Medicine from 1943 until his death in 1945. He was the School's second Indian director and its first non-Indian-Medical-Service director.

Selected publications

Articles

with R. Knowles & L. E. Napier: 

with R. Knowles: 
with Ram Nath Chopra & B. Sen:

Books
with R. Knowles and Ronald Senior-White: 
with R. Knowles and B. C. Basu: 
with R.  Knowles:

References

1880s births
1945 deaths
Bengali scientists
Biologists from British India
Malariologists
Scientists from Kolkata